Louis Percy (born 15 September 1872, date of death unknown) was a French sport shooter who competed in the 1912 Summer Olympics.

He was born in Lorquin.

In 1912 at the Stockholm Games he participated in the following events:

 team free rifle - fourth place
 team rifle - fifth place
 600 metre free rifle - 20th place
 300 metre military rifle, three positions - 23rd place
 300 metre free rifle, three positions - 44th place

Percy was a resistance member during World War II.

References

1872 births
Year of death missing
French male sport shooters
ISSF rifle shooters
Olympic shooters of France
Shooters at the 1912 Summer Olympics
French Resistance members